2nd Nature was an American R&B group from the 1990s. They released one album, What Comes Natural, on March 21, 1995.

History
2nd Nature was formed by producers Don & Oman Quijano, who discovered Jason Turner, Darnel Alexander, and David Booker at Star Search. Leland "L.A." Allen, a former player for the San Diego Chargers and part-time singer, was added to round out the group. David "SuperDave" James and KC Whitaker Schneider should also be credited with managing and promoting the band. They debuted with What Comes Natural, which turned out to be the only album they would release. The album produced a minor hit, "Can U Show Me."

Discography
 What Comes Natural (1995)
 You
 Can U Show Me
 Since I Met U
 Kno Dat U Kno
 Later
 Iz It Enuf
 This Time
 Be Alright
 I Should Be With You
 Comeback
 Lift Every Voice and Sing

Chart history

References

External links
 Darnel Alexander's MySpace
 David Booker's MySpace

Musical groups from Seattle
African-American musical groups
Musical groups established in 1993
Musical groups disestablished in the 1990s
American soul musical groups
American contemporary R&B musical groups
1993 establishments in Washington (state)